Skepparkroken was a locality situated in Ängelholm Municipality, Skåne County, Sweden with 743 inhabitants in 2010. It is considered part of Ängelholm from 2015 onwards.

References 

Populated places in Ängelholm Municipality
Populated places in Skåne County